Bartika Eam Rai is a Nepalese born-American singer-songwriter based in New York City.

In 2016, Rai burst onto public consciousness with the release of her debut album, Bimbaakash. Rai has released two albums so far.

Musical career
Bartika grew up in Lalitpur, Nepal and pursued music informally from the age of six. At around 11 years of age, she was already performing in front of small crowds. She recorded a number of children's songs and was trained by Shreeti Pradhan, Upendra Lal Singh, Roshan Sharma, John Shrestha and Gurudev Kaamat.

It was only after moving to the United States that she began to pursue music professionally as a career. After moving to New York City in 2015, Rai began to work with Nepali-American musician Diwas Gurung, previously of the Ithaca-based progressive rock outfit, Ayurveda. In 2015, they began working on what would become Bimbaakash, a six-song EP, with Rai writing and composing the songs while Gurung produced.

Rai released her first single, Khai, on YouTube in January 2016 to widespread popularity. A review in The Kathmandu Post called the song a "breath of fresh air" and praised the "thrilling aesthetics of its poetry and the simplicity of its delivery".

Rai was nominated for Best New Artist, Song of the Year (for Khai), Best Pop Vocal Performance (Female) (for Khai) and Album of the Year (for Bimbaakash) at the Hits FM Music Awards. She won Song of the Year and Best Pop Vocal Performance (Female).

In March 2018, Rai announced the release of her second album, Taral, once again produced by Gurung. The album was supported by tours across the United States and England and the release of a music video for its first single, Umer.

References

External links
https://soundcloud.com/bartika
https://itunes.apple.com/ca/artist/bartika-eam-rai/1138523318
https://www.youtube.com/watch?v=H7ZODxg0yyY
https://kathmandupost.com/art-entertainment/2018/12/05/one-needs-to-be-reflective-introspective

American people of Nepalese descent
Nepalese pop singers
21st-century Nepalese women singers
Nepalese folk singers
Nepalese singer-songwriters
Nepalese emigrants to the United States
People from New York (state)
Writers from New York City
Musicians from New York (state)
1991 births
Living people
People from Lalitpur District, Nepal
Rai people
Nepali-language singers
American women pop singers
American women singer-songwriters
21st-century American women singers
21st-century American singers